The Great White Fleet was the popular nickname for the group of United States Navy battleships that completed a journey around the globe from December 16, 1907 to February 22, 1909 by order of President Theodore Roosevelt. It consisted of 16 battleships divided into two squadrons, along with various small escorts, and earned its moniker for the stark white paint on its hulls.

The fleet's primarily mission was to make friendly courtesy visits to numerous countries while displaying new U.S. naval power to the world; Roosevelt sought to demonstrate growing American military prowess and blue-water naval capabilities. Another goal was to deter a threatened war with Japan amid growing tensions around 1907. The voyage helped familiarize the 14,500 officers and sailors with the logistical and planning needs for extended fleet action far from home. 

After long neglecting the Navy, Congress started generous appropriations in the late 1880s. Beginning with just 90 small ships, over one-third of them wooden and obsolete, the navy quickly added new steel fighting vessels. The fleet's capital ships were already obsolete compared to the British dreadnoughts in 1907. Nevertheless, it was by far the largest and most powerful fleet that had ever circled the globe; the mission was a success at home and in every country that was visited, including in Europe (which was visited only briefly).

Background and purpose

United States President Theodore Roosevelt dispatched 16 U.S. Navy battleships of the Atlantic Fleet on a worldwide voyage of circumnavigation from 16 December 1907 to 22 February 1909. The hulls were painted white, the Navy's peacetime color scheme, and decorated with gilded scrollwork with a red, white, and blue banner on their bows. The superstructures were painted buff. These ships would later come to be known as the Great White Fleet.

The purpose of the fleet deployment was multifaceted. Ostensibly, it served as a showpiece of American goodwill, as the fleet visited numerous countries and harbors. In this, the voyage was not unprecedented. Naval courtesy calls, many times in conjunction with the birthdays of various monarchs and other foreign celebrations, had become common in the 19th century. Port calls showcased pomp, ceremony, and militarism during a period of rising pre-war nationalism. In 1891, a large French fleet visited Kronstadt, Russia, in conjunction with negotiations between the two nations. Although France and Russia had been hostile to each other for at least three decades prior, the significance of the call was not lost on Russia, and Tsar Nicholas II signed a treaty of alliance with France in 1894. As navies grew larger, naval pageants grew longer, more elaborate, and more frequent. The United States began participating in these events in 1902 when Roosevelt invited Kaiser Wilhelm II of Germany to send a squadron for a courtesy call to New York City. Invitations for U.S. Navy ships to participate in fleet celebrations in the United Kingdom, France, and Germany followed.

Additionally, the voyage of the Great White Fleet demonstrated both at home and on the world stage that the U.S. had become a major sea power in the years after its triumph in the Spanish–American War, with possessions that included Guam, the Philippines, and Puerto Rico. This was not the first demonstration of U.S. naval power; during the Algeciras Conference in 1906, which was convened to settle a diplomatic crisis between France and Germany over the fate of Morocco, Roosevelt had ordered eight battleships to maintain a presence in the Mediterranean Sea. Since Japan had arisen as a major sea power with the 1905 annihilation of the Russian fleet at Tsushima, the deployment of the Great White Fleet was therefore intended, at least in part, to send a message to Tokyo that the American fleet could be deployed anywhere, even from its Atlantic ports, and would be able to defend American interests in the Philippines and the Pacific.

The most serious tensions between the United States and Japan came in 1907, leading to widespread speculation among experts that war was imminent between the two. The main cause was intense Japanese resentment against the mistreatment of Japanese in California. Pulitzer prize-winning biographer Henry Pringle states that sending Great White Fleet so dramatically to Japan in 1908 was, "the direct result of the Japanese trouble." Tensions rapidly de-escalated after the Fleet's very friendly reception in Yokohama.  Thus the gesture neutralized the diplomatic trouble that had resulted from anti-Japanese riots in San Francisco.  Those problems had been resolved by the Gentlemen's Agreement of 1907 and the fleet visit was a friendly gesture to Japan.  The Japanese welcomed it. Roosevelt saw the deployment as one that would encourage patriotism, and give the impression that he would teach Japan "a lesson in polite behavior", as historian Robert A. Hart phrased it.  After the fleet had crossed the Pacific, Japanese statesmen realized that the balance of power in the East had changed.

The voyage also provided an opportunity to improve the sea- and battle-worthiness of the fleet. They were intended as modern warships capable of long-range operations. Nevertheless, the experience gained in the recent war with Spain had been limited.

Concerns and preparations
Roosevelt's stated intent was to give the navy practice in navigation, communication, coal consumption and fleet maneuvering; navy professionals maintained, however, that such matters could be served better in home waters. In light of what had happened to the Russian Baltic Fleet, they were concerned about sending their own fleet on a long deployment, especially since part of the intent was to impress a modern, battle-tested navy that had not known defeat. The fleet was untested in making such a voyage, and Tsushima had proven that extended deployments had no place in practical strategy. The Japanese Navy was close to coaling and repair facilities; while American ships could coal in the Philippines, docking facilities were far from optimal. An extended stop on the West Coast of the United States during the voyage for overhaul and refurbishment in dry dock would be a necessity. Planning for the voyage, however, showed a dearth of adequate facilities there, as well. The main sea channel of the Mare Island Naval Shipyard near San Francisco was too shallow for battleships, which left only the Puget Sound Navy Yard in Bremerton, Washington, for refit and repair. The Hunter's Point civilian yard in San Francisco could accommodate capital ships, but had been closed due to lack of use and was slated for demolition. President Roosevelt ordered that Hunter's Point be reopened, facilities be brought up to date, and the fleet to report there.

Also, the question of adequate resources for coaling existed. This was not an issue when the Atlantic Fleet cruised the Atlantic or Caribbean, as fuel supplies were readily available. However, the United States did not enjoy a worldwide network of coaling stations like that of Great Britain, nor did it have an adequate supply of auxiliary vessels for resupply. During the Spanish–American War, this lack had forced Admiral George Dewey to buy a collier-load of British coal in Hong Kong before the Battle of Manila Bay to ensure his squadron would not run out of steam at sea. The need had been even more pressing for the Russian Baltic Fleet during its long deployment during the Russo-Japanese War, not just for the distance it was to steam, but also because, as a belligerent nation in wartime, most neutral ports were closed to it due to international law. While the lack of support vessels was pointed out and a vigorous program of building such ships suggested by Rear Admiral George W. Melville, who had served as chief of the Bureau of Equipment, his words were not heeded adequately until World War II.

Federal regulations that restricted supply vessels for Navy ships to those flying the United States flag, complicated by the lack of an adequate United States Merchant Marine, proved another obstacle. Roosevelt initially offered to award Navy supply contracts to American skippers whose bids exceeded those of foreign captains by less than 50 percent. Many carriers declined this offer because they could not obtain enough cargo to cover the cost of the return trip. Two months before the fleet sailed, Roosevelt ordered the Navy Department to contract 38 ships to supply the fleet with the 125,000 tons of coal it would need to steam from Hampton Roads, Virginia, to San Francisco. Only eight of these were American-registered; most of the other 30 were of British registry. This development was potentially awkward, since part of the mission was to impress Japan with the perception of overwhelming American naval power. Britain had become a military ally of Japan in 1905 with the Anglo-Japanese Alliance, which obliged it to aid Japan should a foreign power declare war against it. Technically, the list of potential combatants included the United States. The British government decided to play both sides of the political fence with the intent of moderating any Japanese-American friction that might arise.

Prior to the ships’ departure, Congress raised concerns about funding. According to the Naval Historical Center, Maine Senator Eugene Hale made his intention known to withhold funding for the effort. The President's response was that if Congress was unwilling to fund the trip, he already had the funds to send the Fleet out into the Pacific. But if Congress wanted the fleet to return home, they would have to fund the other half of the trip. As noted by Roosevelt biographer Edmund Morris, the President would not be deterred. He stated "I am Commander-in-Chief, and my decision is absolute in the matter."

Voyage

As the Panama Canal was not yet complete, the fleet had to pass through the Straits of Magellan. The scope of such an operation was unprecedented in U.S. history, as ships had to sail from all points of the compass to rendezvous points and proceed according to a carefully orchestrated, well-conceived plan. It involved almost the entire operational capability of the U.S. Navy. During the crossing of the Straits of Magellan, the U.S. ships were escorted by the Chilean Navy cruiser, Chacabuco. 

Unlike the formidable obstacles that had faced the Russian fleet on its voyage from the Baltic to the Pacific, which eventually led to its destruction by the Japanese in 1905, the U.S. effort benefited from a peaceful environment which aided the coordination of ship movements.

After taking nearly four months to round South America, the fleet made several stops in American waters on the Pacific Ocean. In port after port, citizens in the thousands turned out to see and greet the fleet. In April 1908 sixteen battleships anchored off of Coronado, California in the San Diego area, and thousands of sailors and marines took part in a parade through San Diego's streets. The fleet also stopped in Los Angeles and Santa Barbara. In May 1908, the Fleet visited Monterey, California; the nearby Hotel Del Monte in Del Monte, California, hosted a grand ball for the officers of the fleet. After arriving in San Francisco on 6 May, most of the fleet took a side trip to Seattle and Tacoma, then returned to San Francisco. 

On 7 July the entire fleet left San Francisco for Honolulu, New Zealand and Australia. In Australia, the arrival of the Great White Fleet on 20 August 1908 was used to encourage support for the forming of Australia's own navy. In Sicily, the sailors helped in recovery operations after the 1908 Messina earthquake.

Fleet composition

The fourteen-month-long voyage was intended to be a grand pageant of American naval power. The squadrons were manned by 14,000 sailors. The fleet was impressive, especially as a demonstration of American industrial prowess (all eighteen ships had been constructed since the Spanish–American War), but already the battleships represented the suddenly outdated 'pre-dreadnought' type of capital ship, as the first battleships of the revolutionary  had just entered service, and the U.S. Navy's first dreadnought, was already fitting out. After repairs, Alabama and Maine completed their "own, more direct, circumnavigation of the globe" via Honolulu, Guam, Manila, Singapore, Colombo, Suez, Naples, Gibraltar, the Azores, and finally back to the United States, arriving on 20 October 1908, four months before the remainder of the fleet, which had taken a more circuitous route.

The battleships were accompanied during the first leg of their voyage by a "Torpedo Flotilla" of six early destroyers, as well as by several auxiliary ships. The destroyers and their tender did not actually steam in company with the battleships, but followed their own itinerary from Hampton Roads, Virginia to San Francisco, California. Also of note is that the armored cruiser  preceded the Fleet itinerary for its first and second legs by about a month, perhaps making arrangements to later receive the Fleet.

General fleet itinerary

With  as flagship under the command of Rear Admiral Robley D. Evans, the fleet sailed from Hampton Roads on 16 December 1907 for Trinidad, British West Indies, thence to Rio de Janeiro, Brazil; Punta Arenas, Chile; Callao, Peru; Magdalena Bay, Mexico, and up the West Coast, arriving at San Francisco, 6 May 1908.

At San Francisco, Rear Admiral Charles S. Sperry assumed command of the fleet, owing to the poor health of Admiral Evans. Also at San Francisco, the squadrons were slightly rearranged, bringing the newest and best ships in the fleet up to the First Squadron.  was detached and later became the supply ship of the Pacific Fleet. At this time also, Nebraska, under Captain Reginald F. Nicholson, and Wisconsin, under Captain Frank E. Beatty, were substituted for Maine and Alabama. In San Francisco,  was brought forward into First Squadron, First Division and  took her place as flagship, Second Squadron.

Leaving that port on 7 July 1908 the U.S. Atlantic Fleet  visited Honolulu; Auckland, New Zealand; Sydney, Melbourne, and Albany, Australia; Manila, Philippines; Yokohama, Japan; and Colombo, Ceylon; then arriving at Suez, Egypt, on 3 January 1909.

While the fleet was in Egypt, word was received of an earthquake in Sicily, thus affording an opportunity for the United States to show its friendship to Italy by offering aid to its victims. The crew of Illinois recovered the bodies of the American consul, Arthur S. Cheney, and his wife, entombed in the ruins.

Leaving Messina on 9 January 1909, the fleet stopped at Naples, Italy, thence to Gibraltar, arriving at Hampton Roads on 22 February 1909. There, President Roosevelt reviewed the fleet as it passed into the roadstead.

First leg
From Hampton Roads to San Francisco, .

Itinerary

Ships
The Fleet, First Squadron and First Division, were commanded by Rear Admiral Robley D. Evans.
First Division consisted of four ships of the 1906 Connecticut class:
Connecticut, the fleet's flagship,
Captain Hugo Osterhaus;
,
Captain Charles E. Vreeland;
,
Captain William P. Potter; and
Louisiana,
Captain Richard Wainwright.

Second Division was commanded by Rear Admiral William H. Emory.
Second Division consisted of four ships of the 1904 Virginia class:
, the division flagship,
Captain Henry McCrea;
,
Captain William H. H. Southerland;
,
Captain Joseph B. Murdock; and
,
Captain Seaton Schroeder.

Second Squadron and Third Division were commanded by Rear Admiral Charles M. Thomas.
Third Division consisted of one Connecticut-class ship and the three ships of the 1902 Maine class:
Minnesota, the squadron flagship,
Captain John Hubbard;
Maine,
Captain Giles B. Harber;
,
Captain Greenlief A. Merriam; and
,
Captain Charles W. Bartlett.

Fourth Division was commanded by Rear Admiral Charles S. Sperry.
Fourth Division consisted of two ships of the 1901 Illinois class and the two 1900 Kearsarge class ships:
Alabama, the division flagship,
Captain Ten Eyck De Witt Veeder;
Illinois,
Captain John M. Bowyer,
Kearsarge,
Captain Hamilton Hutchins; and
Kentucky,
Captain Walter C. Cowles.

The fleet auxiliaries consisted of
Culgoa (a storeship),
Lieutenant Commander John B. Patton;
Glacier (a storeship),
Commander William S. Hogg;
 (a repair ship),
Commander Valentine S. Nelson;
Yankton (a tender),
Lieutenant Walter R. Gherardi; and
 (a hospital ship).

The "Torpedo Flotilla" of destroyers consisted of
,
Lieutenant Alfred G. Howe;
,
Lieutenant Julius F. Hellweg;
,
Lieutenant Frank McCommon;
,
Lieutenant Charles S. Kerrick;
,
Lieutenant Ernest Friedrick;
,
Lieutenant Hutch I. Cone; and
 (a tender),
Commander Albert W. Grant.

Second leg

Itinerary

 
The second leg of the voyage was from San Francisco to Puget Sound and back. On 23 May 1908 the 16 battleships of the Great White Fleet steamed into Puget Sound where they separated to visit six Washington state ports: Bellingham, Bremerton, Port Angeles, Port Townsend, Seattle and Tacoma. The fleet arrived in Seattle on 23 May and departed 27 May 1908.

Ships
The Fleet, First Squadron, and First Division were commanded by Rear Admiral Charles S. Sperry.
First Division consisted of
Connecticut, the Fleet's flagship,
Captain Hugo Osterhaus;
Kansas,
Captain Charles E. Vreeland;
Minnesota,
Captain John Hubbard;
and Vermont,
Captain William P. Potter.

Second Division was commanded by Rear Admiral Richard Wainwright.
Second Division consisted of
Georgia, the Division flagship,
Captain Edward F. Qualtrough;
Nebraska,
Captain Reginald F. Nicholson, replacing her sister Virginia;
New Jersey,
Captain William H.H. Southerland; and
Rhode Island,
Captain Joseph B. Murdock.

Second Squadron and Third Division were commanded by Rear Admiral William H. Emory.
Third Division consisted of
Louisiana, the Squadron's flagship,
Captain Kossuth Niles;
Virginia,
Captain Alexander Sharp;
Missouri,
Captain Robert M. Doyle; and
Ohio,
Captain Thomas B. Howard.

Fourth Division was commanded by Rear Admiral Seaton Schroeder.
Fourth Division consisted of
Wisconsin, the Division flagship,
Captain Frank E. Beatty, which replaced her sister Alabama;
Illinois,
Captain John M. Bowyer;
Kearsarge,
Captain Hamilton Hutchins; and
Kentucky,
Captain Walter C. Cowles.

The Fleet Auxiliaries were
Culgoa (a storeship),
Lieutenant Commander John B. Patton;
Yankton (a tender),
Lieutenant Commander Charles B. McVay;
Glacier (a storeship),
Commander William S. Hogg;
Relief (a hospital ship),
Surgeon Charles F. Stokes; and
Panther (a repair ship),
Commander Valentine S. Nelson.

Third leg
From San Francisco to Manila, .

Itinerary

Ships
The Fleet, First Squadron, and First Division were commanded by Rear Admiral Charles S. Sperry.
First Division consisted of
Connecticut, the Fleet's flagship,
Captain Hugo Osterhaus;
Kansas,
Captain Charles E. Vreeland;
Minnesota,
Captain John Hubbard; and
Vermont,
Captain William P. Potter.

Second Division consisted of
Georgia, the Division flagship,
Captain Edward F. Qualtrough;
Nebraska,
Captain Reginald F. Nicholson;
New Jersey,
Captain William H.H. Southerland; and
Rhode Island,
Captain Joseph B. Murdock.

The Second Squadron and Third Division were commanded by Rear Admiral William H. Emory.
Third Division consisted of
Louisiana, the Squadron flagship,
Captain Kossuth Niles;
Virginia,
Captain Alexander Sharp;
Missouri,
Captain Robert M. Doyle; and
Ohio,
Captain Thomas B. Howard.

Fourth Division was commanded by Rear Admiral Seaton Schroeder.
Fourth Division consisted of
Wisconsin, the Division flagship,
Captain Frank E. Beatty;
Illinois,
Captain John M. Bowyer;
Kearsarge,
Captain Hamilton Hutchins; and
Kentucky,
Captain Walter C. Cowles.

The Fleet Auxiliaries were
Culgoa (a storeship),
Lieutenant Commander John B. Patton;
Yankton (a tender),
Lieutenant Commander Charles B. McVay;
Glacier (a storeship),
Commander William S. Hogg;
Relief (a hospital ship),
Surgeon Charles F. Stokes; and
Panther (a repair ship),
Commander Valentine S. Nelson.

Final leg

The final leg ran from Manila to Hampton Roads, .

Itinerary

Experience gained
The cruise of the Great White Fleet provided practical experience for US naval personnel in sea duty and ship handling. It also showed the viability of US warships for long-range operations as no major mechanical mishaps occurred. However, while the cruise uncovered design flaws, it did not test the abilities to engage in battle fleet action. In fact, the success of the deployment might have helped obscure design deficiencies that were not addressed until World War I. These included excessive draft, low armor belts, large turret openings and exposed ammunition hoists.

According to Mark Albertson: Theodore Roosevelt's battleships captured the imagination of the world. The cruise proved an immense public relation success for the Navy. Relations were fostered with nations that hitherto had been little more than names on a map; while relations with the familiar capitals were enhanced. The cruise highlighted such deficiencies in American battleship design as the placement of armor and ammunition hoists. The lack of American logistical support was also laid bare, ramming home the lesson that without an adequate homegrown merchant marine, control of the seas was all but impossible....It demonstrated America's ability to transfer power from the Atlantic Ocean to the Pacific. Valuable lessons learned in the projection of sea power would later pay handsome dividends in two global conflicts. But of greater importance is that Roosevelt's gambit elevated the United States to the ranks of a global powers. 

The Times of London editorialized regarding the extremely enthusiastic reception in Australia: "A spectacular display has valuable uses in impressing the masses, who will remember the sight for years, and draw important political deductions therefrom."

Effects on US capital ship design
The South Carolina-class battleship was laid down in 1906 and entered service in 1910 as the first American dreadnought. It was coal fired. For instance, in terms of seaworthiness, all the capital ships in the fleet proved wet in all but the calmest seas, which led to the flared bows of subsequent U.S. battleships, increased freeboard forward and such spray-reducing measures as the elimination of billboards for anchors and gun sponsons. Increased freeboard was needed; this and related considerations demanded increases in beam and overall size.

Deficiencies in seaworthiness in turn reduced the battle-worthiness of the fleet. Turret heights for main armament proved too low and needed to be raised. Casemates for the bow 3-inch guns in the newer pre-dreadnoughts were untenable due to wetness and were removed. Another discovery was that, even when fully loaded, the bottom of the battleships' side armor was visible—and the ships thus vulnerable to shells that might hit beneath it to reach their machinery and magazines—in smooth to moderate seas. The profile of crests and troughs in some ships contributed to this problem. Admiral Evans concluded that the standard  width of belt armor was inadequate.

One other necessity the cruise outlined was the need for tactical homogeneity. Before the cruise, critics such as then-Captain William Sims (to whom President Roosevelt listened) had argued that American warship design had remained too conservative and precluded the level of efficiency needed for the fleet to function as an effective unit. The cruise proved the charge true. This would eventually lead to the building of standard-type battleships in the U.S. Navy. When President Roosevelt convened the 1908 Newport Conference of the Naval War College, he placed responsibility for U.S. battleship design on the General Board of the United States Navy. This gave line officers and planners direct input and control over warship design, a pattern which has persisted to the present day.

Effects on fleet operations
Experience gained by the cruise led to improvements in formation steaming, coal economy and morale. Gunnery exercises doubled the fleet's accuracy. However, the mission also underlined the fleet's dependence on foreign colliers and the need for coaling stations and auxiliary ships for resupply.

See also
 List of circumnavigations
 Big Stick ideology and Peace through strength

Similar voyages 
 Squadron of Evolution — US 19th century squadron touring Europe, nicknamed "White Squadron"
 Cruise of the Special Service Squadron — UK naval circumnavigation tour after the Great War
 Operation Sea Orbit — World cruise by U.S. nuclear-powered vessels without replenishment, inspired by the Great White Fleet

References
Notes

Citations

Bibliography
 
 , for secondary schools
 
 
 
 Hodge, Carl Cavanagh. "A Whiff of Cordite: Theodore Roosevelt and the Transoceanic Naval Arms Race, 1897–1909." Diplomacy & Statecraft 19.4 (2008): 712–31.
 Holmes, James R.  "'A Striking Thing' Leadership, Strategic Communications, and Roosevelt’s Great White Fleet." Naval War College Review 61.1 (2008): 50–67. Online
 Leeman, William, and John B Hattendorf, eds. Forging the Trident: Theodore Roosevelt and the United States Navy (2020) excerpt ch 9.
 Love, Robert W., Jr. History of the US Navy: Volume One 1775–1941 (Stackpole, 1992) 1:434–56.
 McMahon, Christopher. "The Great White Fleet Sails Today?" Naval War College Review 71.4 (2018): 67–90. online
 Megaw, Ruth. "Australia and the Great White Fleet 1908" Journal of the Royal Australian Historical Society (April 1970) 56#2 pp. 121–33; focus on the reasons for the thunderous reception in terms of fear of Japan after its navy sank the Russian navy.
 Neu, Charles E. An Uncertain Friendship: Theodore Roosevelt and Japan, 1906–1909 (1967) pp. 254–309, on war scare with Japan
 
 Oyos, Matthew M. "Theodore Roosevelt and the implements of war." Journal of Military History 60.4 (1996): 631+  online
 Pellett, C. Roger. "Boats of the Great White Fleet: The Standard United States Navy Boats of 1900" Nautical Research Journal (Winter 2012) 57#4 pp. 209–16.

 
 Werry, Margaret. "'The Greatest Show on Earth': Political Spectacle, Spectacular Politics, and the American Pacific." Theatre Journal 57.3 (2005): 355–82. about the Great White Fleet; excerpt

Primary sources
 Codd, Margaret J. With Evans to the Pacific: A Story of the Battle Fleet (1909), a novel.
 Matthews, Franklin. With the Battle Fleet: Cruise of the sixteen battleships of the United States Atlantic Fleet from Hampton Roads to the Golden Gate, December 1907–May 1908 (1908) online

 Matthews, Franklin. Back to Hampton Roads: Cruise of the US Atlantic Fleet from San Francisco to Hampton Roads, July 7, 1908–February 22, 1909 (1909) online

 Miller, Roman John. Around the World with the Battleships (AC McClurg & Company, 1909). online, sailor accounts

 Miller, Roman John.  Pictorial log of the battle fleet cruise around the world (1909).

External links

 US Navy Historical Center Site
 Naval Auxiliary Air Station, Monterey
 Guide to the Theodore W. Richards Great White Fleet Scrapbook, 1908–1909; 1916; 1945 MS 219 held by Special Collection & Archives, Nimitz Library at the United States Naval Academy

1900s in the United States
1900s in transport
Fleets of the United States Navy
Presidency of Theodore Roosevelt
Circumnavigations
United States Navy in the 20th century